Civrac may refer to three communes in the Gironde department in southwestern France:
 Civrac-de-Blaye
 Civrac-en-Médoc
 Civrac-sur-Dordogne